The Together Trust is a British charity, founded in 1870 by Leonard Kilbee Shaw and Richard Bramwell Taylor as the Manchester and Salford Boys' and Girls' Refuges and Homes. It provides care, special education and community support services in the north west of England. It also has a fostering agency.

Activities
The Together Trust's work in special education includes the provision of Ashcroft School (previously CYCES) for pupils aged 8–18 with behavioural, emotional and social difficulties, and  Inscape House School for pupils aged 5–19 with autism, in Cheadle, and Bridge College, a college for young people aged 16–25 with learning difficulties and disabilities, complex needs, communication disorders and autism at Openshaw.

The Trust also operates a fostering agency and has a range of other care services including residential homes, community care and support services.

References

Further reading

 William Edmondson, Making Rough Places Plain. Fifty years' work of the Manchester and Salford Boys' and Girls' Refuges and Homes, 1870–1920, Sherratt & Hughes (1921) (Worldcat record)
 Simpson, Andrew, The Ever Open Door. 150 years of The Together Trust, [The Together Trust] (2020) (https://www.worldcat.org/title/ever-open-door-150-years-of-the-together-trust/oclc/1301081415&referer=brief_results)

External links

Children's charities based in England
Charities based in Greater Manchester
Cheadle, Greater Manchester
Organisations based in Stockport